Jo Zeller Racing is a Swiss motor racing team. It was founded in the early 1990s by Jo Zeller. Currently Jo Zeller Racing competes in the Remus F3 Cup. Jo Zeller always focussed on regional and continental championships in Germany and Europe.

After winning multiple national championships with team founder Jo Zeller, the team had its first major success in the 2005 German Formula 3 Championship with Peter Elkmann.

Current series results

Austria Formula 3 Cup/Remus F3 Cup

Former series results

German Formula 3

† – Shared results with other teams
‡ – Guest driver – ineligible for points.

Formula 3 Euro Series

† – Shared results with other teams
‡ – As Zeller was a guest driver, he was ineligible for points.

Formula Lista Junior

FIA Formula 3 International Trophy

‡ – As Zeller was a guest driver, he was ineligible for points.

FIA Formula 3 European Championship

‡ – As Zeller was a guest driver, he was ineligible for points.

References

External links
 

FIA Formula 3 European Championship teams
German Formula 3 teams
Formula 3 Euro Series teams
Formula BMW teams
British Formula Three teams
Auto racing teams established in 1990